The Oklahoma Storm was a United States Basketball League (USBL) team in Enid, Oklahoma. Founded by sports agent and attorney James Sears Bryant, the Storm successfully captured the USBL championship under head coach Kareem Abdul-Jabbar in 2002, defeating Kansas with a final score of 122–109. The team played its home games at Mark Price Arena and the Chisholm Trail Expo Center. The Oklahoma Storm disbanded following the 2007 season when the USBL dissolved.

Several Storm players, including Willie Burton, LaBradford Smith, Richard Dumas, Gaylon Nickerson, Brent Price, James Lang, Chris Porter, Reggie Slater, Ira Newble, Bubba Wells, Kelly McCarty, Tony Bobbitt and Jamario Moon, played for the NBA either before or after playing for the Storm.

See also
Oklahoma Cavalry
Phillips 66ers
Tulsa Shock

References

External links 
USBL League Website

Sports in Oklahoma City
United States Basketball League teams
Basketball teams in Oklahoma
Enid, Oklahoma
Defunct sports teams in Oklahoma
Basketball teams established in 1999
1999 establishments in Oklahoma
Sports clubs disestablished in 2007
2007 disestablishments in Oklahoma